Xpectation (subtitled "New Directions in Music By Prince") is the twenty-sixth studio album by American recording artist Prince. It was released on January 1, 2003, by NPG Records. It is the first instrumental album released under Prince's own name. Previously unannounced, it was released as an MP3 download on New Year's Day, 2003 to members of the NPG Music Club with no formal artwork, only two weeks after the commercial release of his previous album, One Nite Alone... Live!.

In 2004, Xpectation was released through the NPG Music Club's Musicology Download Store. The artwork by Sam Jennings was officially released in September 2015, when a digital lossless version was made available through music streaming service Tidal. All the tracks in the album have titles starting with the letter 'X'.

Track listing
All songs written by Prince.

Personnel
Musicians
Prince – keyboards and guitar
John Blackwell – drums
Rhonda Smith – bass guitar
Candy Dulfer – saxophone
Vanessa Mae – violin

See also
List of music released from NPG Music Club

References

2003 albums
Prince (musician) albums
Albums produced by Prince (musician)
NPG Records albums
Instrumental albums